John Bernard Taylor (6 May 19291 June 2016) was a British bishop and theologian who served as Bishop of St Albans.

Education
Taylor was educated at Watford Grammar School for Boys and Christ's College, Cambridge (graduating Bachelor of Arts with first class honours {BA Hons} in Classics), and trained for the ministry at Ridley Hall and Jesus College, Cambridge (as Lady Kay scholar); he proceeded Cambridge Master of Arts (MA Cantab).

Priestly ministry
He was made deacon (presumably  at Southwark), and ordained priest at Michaelmas 1957 (22 September), by Bertram Simpson, Bishop of Southwark, at Southwark Cathedral. After a curacy at St Lawrence Church, Morden, he served as Vicar of Henham and Elsenham from 1959 to 1964. During that time he was appointed an examining chaplain to John Tiarks (and later John Trillo), Bishop of Chelmsford in 1962, continuing until 1980.

He was Vice-Principal of Oak Hill Theological College from 1964 to 1972. He was appointed Vicar of All Saints', Woodford Wells and Diocesan Director of Ordinands in 1972; he departed Woodford (but remained DDO) in 1975 to become Archdeacon of West Ham.

Episcopal ministry

In 1980, Taylor was chosen to succeed Robert Runcie (the new Archbishop of Canterbury) as Bishop of St Albans; he was consecrated a bishop on 1 May, by Runcie, at Westminster Abbey). He was enthroned at St Albans Abbey on 14 June 1980, took his seat (as a Lord Spiritual) in the House of Lords in 1985 and retired in August 1995; his successor was Christopher Herbert. Taylor succeeded David Say, Bishop of Rochester as Lord High Almoner in 1988 and stepped down in 1997: his successor in that post was Nigel McCulloch, Bishop of Wakefield. He retired to Cambridge, where he served as an honorary assistant bishop in the Diocese of Ely until his death; he was also licensed to the same role in the Diocese in Europe from 1997 onwards.

Other work
Taylor authored a number of religious books. He became a Knight Commander of the Royal Victorian Order (KCVO) in 1997.

Books

 — republishing of The Minor Prophets

 — recent edition of Ezekiel: An introduction and commentary

Articles

References

1929 births
2016 deaths
Bishops of St Albans
English Christian theologians
Alumni of Christ's College, Cambridge
English male non-fiction writers
Knights Commander of the Royal Victorian Order
People educated at Watford Grammar School for Boys